Habronematidae is a family of nematodes belonging to the order Rhabditida.

Genera

Genera:
 Cheilonematodum Johnston & Mawson, 1941 
 Chitwoodspirura Chabaud & Rousselot, 1956 
 Cyrnea Seurat, 1914

References

Nematodes